Brabant is a traditional geographical region (or regions) in the Low Countries of Europe. It may refer to:

Place names in Europe
 London-Brabant Massif, a geological structure stretching from England to northern Germany

Belgium
 Province of Brabant, which in 1995 was split up into two provinces and an autonomous region:
 Flemish Brabant, in the Flanders region
 Walloon Brabant, in the Wallonia region
 Brussels-Capital Region
 Klein-Brabant, the municipalities Bornem, Puurs and Sint-Amands in the Antwerp province of Flanders region
 East Brabant, or Hageland, an area east of Brussels between the cities of Leuven, Aarschot, Diest and Tienen

Netherlands
 North Brabant province

France
 Brabant-en-Argonne, commune in the Meuse department
 Brabant-le-Roi, commune in the Meuse department
 Brabant-lès-Villers (1973–1982), former commune, amalgamation of Brabant-le-Roi and Villers-aux-Vents

Historical use
 Pagus of Brabant, the original, early medieval territory, divided between several counts, core of the later Landgraviate
 Landgraviate of Brabant (1085–1183), an expansive medieval lordship including Brussels, core of the later Duchy
 Duchy of Brabant, a duchy of the Holy Roman Empire from 1183 until the French Revolution, by which time the northern half was lost to the Dutch Republic
 Staats-Brabant, a territory of the Dutch Republic directly governed by the States-General from 1588 until the French Revolution
 Département of Brabant, a département under various forms of French control, formed from an earlier French Département of the Dommel, and predecessor of modern North Brabant.
 Province of Brabant (called South Brabant, 1815–1830), part of the United Kingdom of the Netherlands, based on earlier French département of the Dyle, became part of Belgium in 1830, now divided into three parts (see above)

Royalty and nobility
 House of Brabant descended from the Reginarid family of Lotharingia
 Duke of Brabant, a dynastic title of the modern Belgian royal family

Place names outside Europe
 Brabant Lake, Saskatchewan, Canada
 Port Brabant, former name of Tuktoyaktuk, Canada
 Brabant, West Virginia, United States
 Le Morne Brabant, a mountain on Mauritius
 Brabant Island, Antarctica

Other uses
 Brabant (or Brabançon), other names for the Belgian Draught, a Belgian breed of horse
 Brabantian, a dialect that formed the basis of the Dutch language
 Brabançonne (or "the Brabantian"), the national anthem of Belgium
 Brabant killers, a 1980s terrorist group
 HNLMS Noord-Brabant ('North Brabant'), several ships of the Dutch navy
 Brabant Company, precursor of the Dutch East India Company (VOC)
 Brabant (train), a Paris-Brussels express train 1963–1995
 Brabant (cruise ship), operated by Fred. Olsen Cruise Lines